Pisan Dorkmaikaew (born May 5, 1984), is a Thai professional footballer who plays as a goalkeeper for Nakhon Ratchasima.

Career
On behalf of the Thailand national football team, Winfried Schäfer was called Pisan to the national team in 2011 before being re-named as a part of the team again in the Milovan Rajevac in 2019 but he never play in any official match with this two called.

In February 2020, Dorkmaikaew announced his retirement from professional football, after a spell with Air Force United. However, later in the same month, he joined MOF Customs United. In December 2020, Dorkmaikaew signed with Thai League 2 club Uthai Thani.

References

External links
 Profile at Goal
 

1984 births
Living people
Pisan Dorkmaikaew
Pisan Dorkmaikaew
Association football goalkeepers
Pisan Dorkmaikaew
Pisan Dorkmaikaew
Pisan Dorkmaikaew
Pisan Dorkmaikaew
Pisan Dorkmaikaew
Pisan Dorkmaikaew
Pisan Dorkmaikaew
Pisan Dorkmaikaew
Pisan Dorkmaikaew
Pisan Dorkmaikaew